The human CDAN1 gene encodes the protein Codanin 1.

This protein that appears to play a role in nuclear envelope integrity, possibly related to microtubule attachments. Mutations in this gene cause congenital dyserythropoietic anemia type I, a disease resulting in morphological and functional abnormalities of erythropoiesis.

References

Further reading 

Genes on human chromosome 15